The Anatolian beylik of Dulkadir, was one of the frontier principalities established by the Turkoman clans Bayat, Afshar and Begdili after the decline of Seljuk Sultanate of Rûm.

Capitals
The capitals of the beylik were located around the town of Elbistan in Kahramanmaraş Province of Turkey in different eras.

History

The beylik started with Zeyneddin Karaca Bey who established himself in the region of Elbistan in 1335, taking the town in 1337 from the Mamluk Sultanate (Cairo) while obtaining the title of governor from the Mamluk Sultan Al-Nasir Muhammad. For a while, the Beylik of Dulkadiroğulları had an influence extending from Kırşehir to Mosul, but with the rise of the Ottomans, they became a buffer state between the Ottomans and the Mamluk Sultanate (Cairo) of Egypt. 

The Dulkadir dynasty gave many brides to the Ottoman dynasty. Emine Hatun, the daughter of Nasreddin Mehmed Bey, the fifth ruler of Dulkadiroğulları State, was Mehmed I's third consort, and thus the mother of Ottoman Sultan Murad II. Their marriage served as an alliance between the Ottomans and this buffer state. Their son Murad II is the ancestor of all succeeding Sultans. Similarly, Mükrime Hatun, the daughter of Süleyman Bey, the sixth ruler of Dulkadiroğulları State, was the third wife of Ottoman Sultan Mehmed II. Moreover, Ayşe Hatun, the daughter of Alaüddevle Bozkürt, the eleventh ruler of the Dulkadir State, was the wife of Ottoman Sultan Bayezid II, and consequently the stepmother of Selim I.

In 1515, after the Battle of Turnadağ, the beylik was conquered by Selim's vezier Hadım Sinan and converted into a sanjak. Selim then appointed the nephew of Alaüddevle Bozkurt Bey, Dulkadiroğlu Ali Bey, as governor of the sanjak. Until the mid-19th century, the region centered on the town of Elbistan in Kahramanmaraş Province of Turkey was often referred to as Dulkadiroğulları (or Zulkadriyye ) State in Ottoman documents.

List of rulers 
 Karaja Beg (1337–1353)
 Garseddin Halil Bey (1353–1386)
 Şaban Süli Bey (Sevli Bey) (1386–1398)
 Sadaka Bey (1398–1399)
 Nasireddin Mehmed Bey (1399–1442)
 Dulkadiroğlu Süleyman Bey (1442–1454)
 Melik Arslan Bey (1454–1465)
 Şah Budak Bey (1465–1467)
 Şehsuvar Bey (1467–1472)
 Şah Budak Bey (second reign) (1472–1480)
 Alaüddevle Bozkurt Bey (1480–1515)
 Dulkadiroğlu Ali Bey (1515–1522)

See also
 Battle of Turnadağ

References

Anatolian beyliks
Dulkadirids
Former countries in Western Asia
History of Kahramanmaraş
History of Adıyaman Province
Vassal states of the Ottoman Empire